Ahsaan Qureshi, also known as Ehsaan Qureshi, is an Indian stand-up comedian. He was born in Seoni, Madhya Pradesh. He is the 2005 runner-up of The Great Indian Laughter Challenge, a stand-up comedy competition on Star One. Qureshi has been a stage performer for the last 20 years. Most of his jokes focus on political satire and social issues. He had put in his name for the reality show at the behest of his friends. 
Lately he has been seen acting in a Bollywood movie, Bombay to Goa released in 2007, Ek Paheli Leela released in 2015, and the Bhojpuri film Hanuman Bhakt Hawaldar released in 2007.
He was seen in SAB TV comedy show Hum Aapke Ghar Mein Rehte Hain. He was a contestant in Bigg Boss 2 in 2007.

Filmography

Television

References

External links
 
 
 

Indian male comedians
Male actors from Madhya Pradesh
Indian male voice actors
Male actors in Hindi cinema
Living people
Indian stand-up comedians
Male actors in Bhojpuri cinema
Participants in Indian reality television series
People from Seoni, Madhya Pradesh
Bigg Boss (Hindi TV series) contestants
Year of birth missing (living people)